Ghosts V–VI refers to two studio albums released by the band Nine Inch Nails in 2020. They were released simultaneously and for free online; thus, in regards to context, could be referenced as either a single entity, or as separate entities.

 Ghosts V: Together
 Ghosts VI: Locusts

See also

Ghosts I–IV